Drop is the seventh album by the band Bride, released in 1995. The album was the only Bride release on Rugged Records. Its sound was a departure from their earlier efforts, using an alternative rock sound, highlighted by banjo and mandolin, which was well received by critics though not by fans. On later releases, Bride returned to their more typical metal based sound.

Track listing
All tracks by Bride

 "Personal Savior" – 4:02
 "Mamma" – 5:04
 "You Never Knew Me" – 4:34
 "Life Is the Blues" – 4:26
 "Help" – 4:58
 "Only Hurts When I Laugh" – 3:43
 "Thrill A Minute" – 3:40
 "How Long" – 4:59
 "Have You Made It?" – 4:13
 "Nobodies Hero" – 4:11
 "I'm The Devil" – 6:57
 "Jesus Came Back via Jesus In a Pawn Shop" – 3:57

Personnel 
Dale Thompson - vocals
Troy Thompson - guitar, mandolin, banjo
Jerry McBroom - drums, percussion
Steve Curtsinger - bass guitar
Recording, engineering, mixing - Chris and Dino Maddalone
Mastered by Eddie Schreyer
Art Direction - David Bach
Photography - Michelle Thompson

References 

1995 albums
Bride (band) albums